Quaid-e-Azam Residency, also known as Ziarat Residency, is located in Ziarat, Balochistan, Pakistan. It is where Muhammad Ali Jinnah spent the last two months and ten days of his life, nursed by A. S. Nathaniel. It is the most famous landmark of the city, constructed in 1892 during the British Raj. The building is a wooden structure, originally designed as a sanatorium before being converted into the summer residence of the agent of the Governor General. It is declared a heritage site and is of great architectural importance.

Property damage

On 29 October 2008, at around 4 am, Ziarat and surrounding areas were struck by an earthquake doublet. The first tremor, 6.2 magnitude, lasted a couple of seconds, and was followed by a magnitude-6.4 tremor that lasted almost 30 seconds, destroying many mud houses, several government buildings and neighbouring houses. The residency was also damaged during the 2008 earthquake.

On 15 June 2013, the Residency was targeted with rockets. The wooden parts of the building were badly affected as a result of the attack. Militants belonging to BLA  claimed responsibility. It was badly damaged as a result of the intense attack. However, the government of Pakistan vowed to restore the site. However, despite the wooden structure being badly damaged in the 2013 attack, the concrete structure was standing and the photographs along with the other artifacts were safe and sound.

Rehabilitation

The reconstruction work completed by renowned builder Nayyer Ali Dada and the rehabilitated Ziarat Residency opened on August 14, 2014, by then Prime Minister Nawaz Sharif. The Building is now open for all to visit it.

Depictions

The Quaid-e-Azam Residency has appeared on the 100-rupee note since 2006.

See also
 Jinnah family
 Mazar-e-Quaid
 Quaid-e-Azam House
 Wazir Mansion
 Jinnah House
 Flagstaff House

References

External links

 Quaid's Residency - VT
 A picture of the Quaid-e-Azam residency - offroadpakistan.com
 Rockets kill one, gut historic building in Baluchistan

Ziarat District
Monuments and memorials in Pakistan
Buildings and structures in Ziarat District
Burned buildings and structures in Pakistan
Houses completed in 1892
Archaeological sites in Balochistan, Pakistan
Memorials to Muhammad Ali Jinnah